"Where You At" is a song by American recording artist Joe. The mid-tempo R&B track was written and produced by Warren "Oak" Felder and Sean Garrett for his sixth studio album Ain't Nothin' Like Me (2007) and features guest vocals by rapper Papoose. Released as the album's lead single, it reached number 92 on the UK Singles Chart.

Track listing
Digital download
"Where You At" (Main Version; featuring Papoose) – 4:16
"Where You At" (Instrumental; featuring Papoose) – 4:08

Charts

References

2006 singles
2006 songs
Joe (singer) songs
Jive Records singles
Songs written by Sean Garrett
Songs written by Oak Felder
Song recordings produced by Oak Felder